Mananjary is the name of:

Mananjary, a town in the region Vatovavy, Madagascar
Mananjary River, in southern Madagascar 
Mananjary (district)
Mananjary Airport